The Avaya Virtual Services Platform 8000 Series, or VSP 8000, is a standalone Ethernet Switch, manufactured by Avaya and intended for use in Campus network and Data Center deployment scenarios.

The VSP 8000 is new category of high-performance Ethernet Switches developed by Avaya to leverage the latest generation application-specific integrated circuit chipsets.  The Virtual Services Platform 8284XSQ is the first product in the VSP 8000 Series and is a fixed, compact form-factor Ethernet Switch designed to satisfy mainstream Campus Core Switch requirements.

The VSP 8284XSQ is an 84-port Ethernet Switch, supporting a mix of 10 Gigabit Ethernet and 40 Gigabit Ethernet ports.   Network operators may choose to deploy it either in conventional IP Routed network topologies or as part of a network virtualization solution using the Avaya VENA Fabric Connect technology.  Fabric Connect is an extended implementation of the IEEE 802.1aq standard for Shortest Path Bridging (SPB), and the VSP 8200 will be interoperable with third party products that also implement this Standard.

The product is typically positioned as the Core Switch in mid-market and small-to-medium Enterprise networks, or as an Aggregation/Distribution Switch in larger networks.  Due to its ability to support both conventional and virtualized networking technologies – and operate both concurrently  the VSP 8000 is suitable in deployment scenarios that require high-availability, network segmentation, and dynamic provisioning.   Additionally, the high-density of 10 Gigabit Ethernet (80 ports), plus support for 40 Gigabit Ethernet (4 ports), makes the VSP 8284XSQ model suitable for use as a Data Center Middle/End-of-Row Switch.

History 
In November 2010, Avaya introduced "Virtual Enterprise Network Architecture" (VENA) as its overarching solution set of networking technologies.  The role of VENA is to concentrate development activity on a set of key enabling technologies that will be made available, individually or collectively, across multiple hardware platforms.  In this way, it is Avaya’s intention to at least partially abstract software functionality from hardware capability; certain considerations remain - processing and memory capacity - but, in general, VENA technologies would largely become hardware-independent.

An important foundational element to VENA was the release of the Fabric Connect technology, an implementation of the IEEE 802.1aq SPB, extended and enhanced by Avaya to integrate Layer 3, IP Routing, and IP Multicast capabilities, in addition to the topology, loop-avoidance, multi-path, and Layer 2 functionality native to SPB.  Fabric Connect also conforms to the IETF  Standard for IS-IS extensions to support SPB.

In April 2014, Avaya announced the VSP 8000 Series as part of its participation in the Interop trade event in Las Vegas.  Following on from 2013, Avaya was again selected to be the provider of the InteropNet network backbone, delivering an end-to-end virtualized network solution based on Fabric Connect technology.

In June 2014, Avaya launched the VSP 8000 Series with the release of the first product in the line, the VSP 8284XSQ Ethernet Switch.

Product Specification 
The VSP 8284XSQ is a fixed, compact form-factor Ethernet Switch that operates the Virtual Services Platform Operating System (VOSS), and provides eighty 1/10 Gigabit Ethernet SFP+ ports and four 40 Gigabit Ethernet QSFP+ ports.  The VSP 8284XSQ supports high-availability AC power (1+1), field-replaceable fan trays, and front-to-back airflow.

The system inherits VOSS from the Avaya VSP 9000 modular, chassis-based product, in the same manner as the Avaya VSP 4000 fixed-format Ethernet Switch.  Implementing VOSS meant that the VSP 8000 automatically inherited support for two key VENA technologies: Fabric Connect for end-to-end network virtualization, and Switch Cluster for high-availability device virtualization, in addition to supporting conventional IP Routing.

VSP 8284XSQ Ethernet Switch base hardware configuration:
 80 x 1/10 Gigabit Ethernet SFP+ ports
 4 x 40 Gigabit Ethernet QSFP+ ports
 1 x 800W AC power supply unit with the appropriate power cord
 4 x field-replaceable fan modules
 RJ45 Serial Console port, 10/100/1000BASE-T Out-of-Band Management Ethernet port, and USB 2.0 port
 Physical Dimensions: 440mm wide (fitted for 19 inch racks), 500mm deep, and 88.9 mm tall (2RU)
 Software License: Base Software License is included with the base hardware and covers all software features
 Optional Hardware: Second 800W AC power supply unit to deliver power resiliency
 Warranty:  Covered by Avaya’s Lifetime Warranty
The VSP 8284XSQ is based on a high-performance Broadcom chipset rated at 2.56Tbit/s, and while not alone in utilizing this component, the packaging in what Avaya term a “Compact Form-Factor” was unique at the time of launch.  At just 2 Rack Units, the VSP 8284XSQ delivers very high 10/40 Gigabit Ethernet port density, particularly considering the typically deployment scenario would involve dual Switches.

See also 
 Avaya
 Avaya Networking Products
 Avaya VSP 9000 Series
 Avaya VSP 4000 Series

References

External links 
 Dpclub28.com
 DhakaEarn.com

Avaya